The third season of the American television series Arrow premiered on The CW on October 8, 2014, and concluded on May 13, 2015, with a total of 23 episodes. The series is based on the DC Comics character Green Arrow, a costumed crime-fighter created by Mort Weisinger and George Papp, and is set in the Arrowverse, sharing continuity with other Arrowverse television series. The showrunners for this season were Greg Berlanti, Marc Guggenheim and Andrew Kreisberg. Stephen Amell stars as Oliver Queen, with principal cast members Katie Cassidy as Laurel Lance, David Ramsey as John Diggle, Willa Holland as Thea Queen, Emily Bett Rickards as Felicity Smoak, Colton Haynes as Roy Harper, John Barrowman as Malcolm Merlyn and Paul Blackthorne as Quentin Lance also returning from previous seasons.

The series follows billionaire playboy Oliver Queen (Stephen Amell), who claimed to have spent five years shipwrecked on Lian Yu, a mysterious island in the North China Sea, before returning home to Starling City (later renamed "Star City") to fight crime and corruption as a secret vigilante whose weapon of choice is a bow and arrow. In the third season, Oliver's company Queen Consolidated is sold to businessman, scientist and aspiring hero Ray Palmer (Brandon Routh), who changes the company's name to Palmer Technologies and hires Felicity as vice president. After Sara is found murdered, Oliver becomes embroiled in a conflict with Ra's al Ghul (Matt Nable). He struggles to reconnect with his sister, Thea, who knows Malcolm is her father. Laurel sets out to follow Sara as the Black Canary. Meanwhile, John becomes a father and struggles as a family man. The season features flashbacks to Oliver's third year since he was presumed dead, where after escaping Lian Yu, he is forced to work for A.R.G.U.S. leader Amanda Waller (Cynthia Addai-Robinson) in Hong Kong. Oliver and Tatsu Yamashiro (Rila Fukushima) work to stop corrupt general Matthew Shrieve (Marc Singer) from unleashing a pathogen, which Ra's al Ghul acquires in the present.

The series was renewed for its third season on February 12, 2014, and began filming in Vancouver, British Columbia, Canada in that July. Despite a strong critical start for the season premiere, the season received more negative reviews than the previous seasons, and averaged 3.52 million viewers each week. The season would go on to be nominated for eleven nominations in various categories, winning two. This season includes the first annual Arrowverse crossover with spin-off TV series The Flash. The season was released on DVD and Blu-ray on September 22, 2015. The series was renewed for a fourth season in January 2015.

Episodes

Cast and characters

Main 
 Stephen Amell as Oliver Queen / Arrow
 Katie Cassidy as Laurel Lance / Black Canary
 David Ramsey as John Diggle
 Willa Holland as Thea Queen / Speedy
 Emily Bett Rickards as Felicity Smoak
 Colton Haynes as Roy Harper / Arsenal
 John Barrowman as Malcolm Merlyn / Dark Archer
 Paul Blackthorne as Quentin Lance

Recurring

Guest

Production

Development 
Arrow was renewed for a third season by The CW on February 12, 2014.

Writing 
Talking ahead of San Diego Comic Con, executive producer Marc Guggenheim stated that the theme of the season would be 'identity'. He and fellow EP Andrew Kreisberg confirmed that the series would continue six months on from the end of the previous season. Producers confirmed that the flashback sequences would continue this season, but be focused on Oliver's time in Hong Kong, and also examine the beginnings of his relationship with Amanda Waller.

Regarding character arcs, Guggenheim confirmed that both the characters of Thea Queen and Laurel Lance would be developed further over the season saying "Laurel and Thea are the two characters we haven't done as much with in the past, and they have the strongest storylines that we've ever given them." In particular, Thea's relationship with her father Malcolm Merlyn would be further explored, including a flashback to their encounter in the season two finale. Regarding Laurel, Kreisberg stated that "We're going to see Laurel take a few big steps toward  her comic book self this season." Following previous revelations that the first episode would feature a date between Oliver and Felicity Smoak, Kreisberg stated that "The way the show has shaken out and the experiences the two have had, it feels like it's time to explore that." He also confirmed that Brandon Routh's Ray Palmer would be "invading Oliver's life in every aspect", as well as injecting more humor into the season.

It was also disclosed at San Diego that the season would feature an episode exploring the origins of the character Felicity Smoak, to be entitled "Oracle", which would focus on her time at M.I.T. It was confirmed by Marc Guggengheim in August that the episode name had been changed to "The Secret Origin of Felicity Smoak" and that the episode would also introduce Felicity's mother, Donna Smoak.

Kreisberg also confirmed that Colin Donnell would make an appearance as Tommy Merlyn in the second episode of the season, during a flashback sequence.

The preview of the third season trailer revealed the season 'big bad' to be Ra's al Ghul. Talking about potential story arcs, Kreisberg noted the possibility of Oliver working with Malcolm Merlyn against Ra's – "We've established firmly that Ra's al Ghul hates Merlyn and Oliver doesn't like Merlyn. It's going to be series of who hates who more. The enemy of my enemy is my friend."

Casting 
In July 2014, the series cast several season regulars, including Brandon Routh as Ray Palmer along with J. R. Ramirez was Ted Grant / Wildcat, Karl Yune as Maseo Yamashiro and Rila Fukushima as Tatsu Yamashiro Vinnie Jones was also cast as Danny Brickwell, in a guest role. The following month, it was announced that Charlotte Ross would be joining the series as Felicity's mother, Donna Smoak. Later the same month, Nolan Gerard Funk was cast as Felicity's former boyfriend Cooper Seldon. In September, Matt Nable was cast in the role of the season's antagonist, Ra's al Ghul. Film actor Liam Neeson, who played the character in the Christopher Nolan Batman films Batman Begins and The Dark Knight Rises, originally expressed an interest in reprising the role for the show, but couldn't take up offer when the showrunners approached him due to scheduling conflicts. Amy Gumenick was cast in a guest role as Carrie Cutter in the same month. Caity Lotz was confirmed to return as Sara Lance for at least three episodes at the start of the season.

Filming 
The season began filming in Vancouver, British Columbia, Canada in July 2014.

Arrowverse tie-ins 
The third season includes the first annual crossover with spin-off series The Flash: "Flash vs. Arrow".

Release

Broadcast 
The season began airing in the United States on The CW on October 8, 2014, and completed its 23-episode run on May 13, 2015.

Home media 
Arrow: Season 3 was released as a 5-disc DVD set and as a 9-disc Blu-ray and DVD combo pack set on September 22, 2015, in the United States and September 28, 2015, in the United Kingdom. The DVD and Blu-ray box sets contain additional features, including making-of featurettes, deleted scenes, gag reel, and highlights from the Paley Fest.

Reception

Critical response 
Despite a strong critical start for the third-season premiere, the season received more negative reviews than the previous seasons.

Writing for Entertainment Weekly, Chancellor Agard noted that season had been an uneven one where the "highs have been rather high and the lows have been almost insufferable" and highlighted that the season' biggest problem seemed to lie in the characterisation and motivation of the season's big bad, Ra's al Ghul. He did however praise the development of the character Laurel Lance as well as the development of Oliver's relationship with John Diggle.

Katie Kulzick, of A.V. Club noted that the season had a habit of "making bold moves and all too frequently backing away from, rather than embracing, the ramifications of these series-altering decisions." Despite the season's "significant problems", she felt groundwork had been laid for interesting potential storylines, in particular the development of Thea Queen becoming a member of the team as Speedy, for Felicity Smoak with Palmer Technologies and for Oliver to develop a fresh perspective.

The season finale was described as "dull", "lacking scope", and "underwhelming" by IGN's Jesse Schedeen in light of the "high standard" the show had previously established for its finales. He cemented the mixed reception of the third season as being "haphazardly paced" and "struggling to develop a clear sense of direction".

The third season holds a score of 90% on Rotten Tomatoes based on 9 reviews, with an average rating of 8.37/10. The site's consensus concluding: "Arrow stays on target with new characters and a steady supply of exciting action."

Ratings 
The third season averaged 3.52 million viewers across the 23 episodes, ranking 135th among television show viewership.

Accolades 

|-
! scope="row" rowspan="12" | 2015
| rowspan="3" | Leo Awards
| Best Cinematography Dramatic Series
| data-sort-value="Miles, C. Kim" | C. Kim Miles ("Blind Spot")
| 
| 
|-
| Best Costume Design Dramatic Series
| data-sort-value="Mani, Maya" | Maya Mani ("Suicide Squad")
| 
| 
|-
| Best Lead Performance BY A Female Dramatic Series
| data-sort-value="Rickards, Emily Bett" | Emily Bett Rickards ("Left Behind")
| 
| 
|-
| rowspan="2" | MTV Fandom Awards
| TV Dramas
| data-sort-value="Arrow" | Arrow
| 
| 
|-
| Ship of the Year
| data-sort-value="Amell, Stephen and Emily Bett Rickards" | Olicity (Stephen Amell and Emily Bett Rickards)
| 
| 
|-
| Saturn Awards
| Best Superhero Adaption Television Series
| data-sort-value="Arrow" | Arrow
| 
| 
|-
| rowspan="5" | Teen Choice Awards
| Choice Sci-Fi/Fantasy TV Show
| data-sort-value="Arrow" | Arrow
| 
| 
|-
| Choice Sci-Fi/Fantasy TV Actor
| data-sort-value="Amell, Stephen" | Stephen Amell
| 
| 
|-
| Choice Sci-Fi/Fantasy TV Actress
| data-sort-value="Rickards, Emily Bett" | Emily Bett Rickards
| 
| 
|-
| Choice TV Liplock
| data-sort-value="Amell, Stephen and Emily Bett Rickards" | Stephen Amell and Emily Bett Rickards
| 
| 
|-
| Choice TV Villain
| data-sort-value="Nable, Matt" | Matt Nable
| 
| 
|}

References

External links 

 
 

Arrow (TV series) seasons
2014 American television seasons
2015 American television seasons
Television series set in 1993
Television series set in 2009